The State Basketball Centre is a sports arena located in Melbourne, Victoria, Australia which is mainly used for basketball. However, the centre has been used for several other events. The stadium features six courts, including one basketball show court with seating for 3,200. Facilities cater primarily for basketball, with five courts being able to be configured for netball. The stadium houses the offices of Basketball Australia, Basketball Victoria, Knox Basketball Incorporated, South East Melbourne Phoenix and hosts WNBL games for the Southside Flyers and Melbourne Boomers. The stadium also hosts a select number of Phoenix home games each NBL season.

On March 3 and 4 2021, the State Basketball Centre hosted four games as part of the inaugural NBL Cup.

References

External links

Official website

Melbourne Boomers
National Basketball League (Australia) venues
Basketball venues in Australia
Sports venues completed in 2012
Sports venues in Melbourne
2012 establishments in Australia
Sport in the City of Knox